Anders Møller (22 February 1883 – 22 October 1966) was a Danish wrestler. He competed in the men's Greco-Roman lightweight at the 1908 Summer Olympics.

References

1883 births
1966 deaths
Danish male sport wrestlers
Olympic wrestlers of Denmark
Wrestlers at the 1908 Summer Olympics
Sportspeople from Copenhagen